Arthur Trebilcock (13 December 1907 – 2 May 1972) was an Australian cricketer. He played one first-class match for Tasmania in 1932/33.

See also
 List of Tasmanian representative cricketers

References

External links
 

1907 births
1972 deaths
Australian cricketers
Tasmania cricketers
Cricketers from Tasmania
People from Zeehan